Nepean Highway is a major highway in Victoria, running south from St Kilda Junction in inner-southern Melbourne to Portsea, tracing close to the eastern shore of Port Phillip for the majority of its length. It is the primary road route from central Melbourne through Melbourne's southern suburbs. This name covers a few consecutive roads and is not widely known to most drivers except for its central section, as the entire allocation is still best known by the names of its constituent parts: St Kilda Road, Brighton Road and Nepean Highway proper, and Point Nepean Road. This article will deal with the entire length of the corridor for sake of completion, as well to avoid confusion between declarations.

Route

St Kilda Junction to Mornington
Historically starting at the Melbourne CBD at Princes Bridge as St Kilda Road and heading south through the Melbourne Arts Precinct, today Nepean Highway is declared to commence at St Kilda Junction as St Kilda Road and heads in a southerly direction until it reaches the intersection with Carlisle Street (prior to the widening in the late 1960s this section was formerly known as High Street), where it changes name to Brighton Road and heads in a south-easterly direction until it reaches the intersection with Glen Huntly Road in Elsternwick, where it changes name again to become Nepean Highway proper. Tram route 67 runs down the middle of the highway until it turns into Glen Huntly Road. In 1984 conversion of the seven kilometre section between Cochrane Street, Elsternwick and South Road, Moorabbin to a dual carriageway was completed. At Glen Huntly Road, the speed limit increases to 80 km/h and the road widens to become an eight-lane dual carriageway. It is reduced to six lanes at Moorabbin, passing through Cheltenham and Mentone, and then to the 60 km/h or 70 km/h four-lane single carriageway after the roundabouts at Mordialloc. The highway then travels virtually along the foreshore of Port Phillip Bay to Frankston, with several stretches of dual carriageway, and then up Olivers Hill, from which there are good views across Frankston and the bay.

Mornington Peninsula
In the late 1960s a bypass road was constructed in the suburb of Mount Eliza. Previously the highway travelled through the main shopping village: this section is now known as Mount Eliza Way.

After passing through Mount Martha, the highway runs parallel to the Mornington Peninsula Freeway, before turning toward the town of Dromana. Here the highway changes name again, to become Point Nepean Road, its former name in the early years of settlement. From here, Arthurs Seat is accessible, which gives views across the bay, and on a clear day, the skyscrapers of Melbourne are visible. Anthonys Nose is a point, or escarpment located on the southern shore of Port Phillip Bay, between Dromana and McCrae. The highway passes between "The Nose" and the shores of the bay. It was named by Charles La Trobe in 1839. In the 1920s "The Nose" was modified in order to combat the daily tides that blocked the highway.

Route B110 leaves the highway at Sorrento to cross the bay to Queenscliff, via the ferry where it continues to Geelong, via Bellarine Highway, but the highway continues as a two lane road down to the seaside resort of Portsea. The end of the highway is the very nondescript painted turning circle, before the gates of the former Commonwealth quarantine and defence station of Point Nepean, a humble ending to Melbourne's main southern highway.

History
Originally known as Arthurs Seat Road, it was built in the 1850s to provide a road (originally a crude sandy track) from the farms (owned by Jude Roberts) south of Melbourne and link the city with its southern bay settlements and sea defences at Point Nepean.

The passing of the Highways and Vehicles Act of 1924 through the Parliament of Victoria provided for the declaration of State Highways, roads two-thirds financed by the State government through the Country Roads Board (later VicRoads). Nepean Highway was declared a State Highway in the 1947/48 financial year, from Glenhuntly Road in Elsternwick via Frankston to Portsea (for a total of 55 miles); before this declaration, the road was referred to as Point Nepean Road. It was named after Point Nepean, itself named after the British politician and Colonial Administrator, Sir Evan Nepean, 1st Baronet PC.

Nepean Highway was signed as Metropolitan Route 3 between Melbourne and Portsea in 1965; with Victoria's conversion to the newer alphanumeric system in the late 1990s, the southern half of the highway from Mornington to Sorrento was replaced by route B110, which continues on the other side of the bay at Queenscliff to run along Bellarine Highway until Geelong.

The passing of the Transport Act of 1983 (itself an evolution from the original Highways and Vehicles Act of 1924) updated the provision for the declaration of State Highways through VicRoads. Point Nepean Road was declared a Tourist Toad in May 1991, between Marine Drive in Dromana and the end of the road in Portsea; however the road was still known (and signposted) as Nepean Highway.

The passing of the Road Management Act 2004 granted the responsibility of overall management and development of Victoria's major arterial roads to VicRoads: in 2004, VicRoads re-declared the road as Nepean Highway (Arterial #6660), beginning at St Kilda Road at St Kilda (this declaration formally includes today's St Kilda Road from St Kilda Junction and Brighton Road, but signposts along this section have kept its original name) and ending at Mornington-Flinders Road (sign-posted as Nepean Highway) in Dromana (better known as the Mount Martha interchange with the Mornington Peninsula Freeway), and the renaming of Nepean Highway as Point Nepean Road (Arterial #4034) between Mornington-Dromana Road (known as Marine Drive) between Dromana and the end of the road in Portsea. The remnant between the intersection with Marine Parade and the Mount Martha interchange with the Mornington Peninsula Freeway have been declared as Bittern-Dromana Road (Arterial #5754) between Marine Parade and Bittern-Dromana Road proper, and Mornington-Flinders Road (Arterial #5751) between Mornington-Flinders Road proper and the Mount Martha interchange; these sections are still sign-posted as Nepean Highway.

Between the 1950s and about 1980, the road was progressively upgraded to a divided highway between the City and Mordialloc. From Mordialloc to Frankston, the highway is an undivided four lane road. The widening of the Mordialloc Bridge, the last section of less than four lanes, was completed in early 2009.

Possible future north-south connection
Transurban, in their Response to the Eddington Report, July 2008, believe a north–south corridor from the Hume Freeway and Metropolitan Ring Road to the Nepean Highway south of Glen Huntly Road, Elsternwick, generally via the Hoddle Highway corridor, deserves attention.

This alignment would follow the original F2 Freeway corridor as proposed in the 1969 Melbourne Transportation Plan.

Major intersections and towns

Gallery

See also

References

Highways in Australia
Highways and freeways in Melbourne
Transport in the City of Port Phillip
Transport in the City of Glen Eira
Transport in the City of Bayside
Transport in the City of Kingston (Victoria)
Transport in the City of Frankston
Transport in the Shire of Mornington Peninsula